National Stadium is a baseball park located in Stratford, Ontario. It opened in 1920 and was built by the CNR Recreation Committee. It was home to the Stratford Nationals of the Intercounty Baseball League. The park still stands and hosts recreational baseball.

Sports venues in Ontario
Sport in Stratford, Ontario
Buildings and structures in Stratford, Ontario